The Archaeological Museum of Rhodes is located in the Medieval City of Rhodes. The museum is housed in the monumental edifice that was the hospital of the Knights of Saint John. Construction was begun in 1440 and brought to completion in the time of the Grand Master d'Aubusson (1476-1503). The Museum contains various collections of archaeological artifacts from various parts of Rhodes and the neighbouring islands, including the Statue of the Crouching Aphrodite (1st century BC), which was inspired by a famous prototype work created by the sculptor Doidalsas in the 3rd century BC, and the Pyxis of the Fikellura type (mid-6th century BC).

The museum also holds the Head of Helios, which was featured in 2011 on the album cover of Floral Shoppe by Macintosh Plus, and subsequently became famous for its association with the Vaporwave movement.

Gallery

External links

Hellenic Ministry of Culture and Tourism / in Greek
Hellenic Ministry of Foreign Affairs

Rhodes
Buildings and structures in Rhodes (city)
Museums in Rhodes